The Vaitepiha is a river and valley of southeastern Tahiti, French Polynesia. It flows into the sea at Tautira.

References

Rivers of Tahiti